Heliotropium shoabense is a species of plant in the family Boraginaceae. It is endemic to Yemen.

References

Endemic flora of Socotra
shoabense
Data deficient plants
Taxonomy articles created by Polbot